The 2004 Harlow District Council election took place on 10 June 2004 to elect members of Harlow District Council in Essex, England. One third of the council was up for election and the council stayed under no overall control.

After the election, the composition of the council was
Conservative 13
Labour 11
Liberal Democrats 9

Background
After the last election in 2003 both the Conservatives and Liberal Democrats had 12 seats, while Labour had 9 councillors. However, in July 2003 councillor Jane Steer defected from the Liberal Democrats to the Conservatives, making the Conservatives the largest group on the council for the first time in almost 50 years with 13 seats. The joint administration between the Conservatives and Liberal Democrats continued to run the council.

Meanwhile, in January 2004 the Liberal Democrat group on the council expelled Matthew Shepherd from the party's group on the council.

Election result
Overall turnout at the election was 37%.

Ward results

Bush Fair

Church Langley

Great Parndon

Harlow Common

Little Parndon & Hare Street

Mark Hall

Netteswell

Old Harlow

Staple Tye

Sumners and Kingsmoor

Toddbrook

References

2004
2004 English local elections
2000s in Essex